Nega may refer to:

 Berhanu Nega (born 1958), mayor of Addis Ababa, Ethiopia
 Nega Mezlekia (born 1958), Ethiopian writer who writes in English
 Nega (album), a 1997 album by Maxim Fadeev